Steel Reserve, also known as 211, is an American lager brand owned and produced by Steel Brewing Company, which is owned by Miller, a subsidiary of Molson Coors. The drink comes in "Black" and "Silver" varieties, also known as "Triple Export Malt Liquor" and "High Gravity Lager", respectively. It has a high alcohol content (typically 8.1% ABV). It was introduced in 1994.

General
Steel Reserve is sold in  bottles. It also is distributed in  cans,  bottles,  cans in packs of four or six, and  cans in packs of six or twelve. In 2016 the company replaced its 40 oz. narrow-neck glass bottles with 42 oz. wide-neck, shatterproof plastic bottles.

Availability
The 40-ounce, 8.1% ABV variety is widely available throughout the US; however, some states require the beverage to be sold as a diluted 6.0% ABV and in Utah 5.0% ABW within accordance of state law. 

In 2015, a new lineup of fruit flavored 8.0% ABV 16 fl. oz. cans was introduced in the United States. Flavors include: BLK Berry, Hard Pineapple, Spiked Punch, Spiked Razz, and Spiked Watermelon.

Awards and ratings

In 2012, Steel Reserve 8.1% ABV received the gold medal in the category of 'American-Style Premium Lager or Specialty Lager' at the World Beer Cup. Additionally, the American malt liquor style ale has been rated within the 83 percentile earning the good rating by Beeradvocate, while users of the site have accumulated a rating of 60 - poor (2017).  Alternatively, Ratebeer has given an accumulative rating of 0 overall and 10 for overall style.

Competitor response
Anheuser-Busch also adopted the "High Gravity" nomenclature, referring to the term specific gravity, a measurement used to quantify the sugars available to produce alcohol in a fermented beverage, which may give an indication of alcohol content, and released Hurricane High Gravity Lager with the same alcohol content, container sizes, and similar price.

Advertising
Reverend Horton Heat and the Ramones were commissioned to release several radio jingles for the beverage in the 1990s.

References

External links
The Steel Brewing Company

Molson Coors brands